Battles With The Red Boy is a 1972 Taiwanese Hong Kong film.

References

1972 films
Hong Kong action films
1970s action films
1970s Mandarin-language films
Taiwanese action films
1970s Hong Kong films